Neuhof an der Zenn is a municipality in the district of Neustadt (Aisch)-Bad Windsheim in Bavaria in Germany.

Mayor
Since 2020: Claudia Wust

References

Neustadt (Aisch)-Bad Windsheim